Leucospis is a genus of wasps belonging to the family Leucospidae. Most species are brightly coloured with yellow and black patterning and about 2 cm long. They have characteristically enlarged femurs on the hind leg, with the lower margin toothed. The wings have a longitudinal fold and the long ovipositor is bent over their backs above the abdomen or metasoma. They are parasitic on wasps and solitary bees that construct cells and provision food for their offspring. The Leucospis larvae live and grow as ectoparasites of the host larvae. Usually, only one parasite emerges from a single cell. The genus Micrapion from South Africa is very closely related, and phylogenetic studies suggest merging of the two genera. The genus Leucospis is found across the world in the tropical regions.

Species
Species within this genus include:

 Leucospis addenda Boucek, 1974
 Leucospis affinis Say, 1824
 Leucospis africana Cameron, 1907
 Leucospis aliena Boucek, 1974
 Leucospis anthidioides Westwood, 1874
 Leucospis antiqua Walker, 1862
 Leucospis aruina Walker, 1862
 Leucospis atriceps (Girault, 1925)
 Leucospis aurantiaca Shestakov, 1923
 Leucospis auripyga Boucek, 1974
 Leucospis australis Walker, 1871
 Leucospis azteca Cresson, 1872
 Leucospis bakeri Crawford, 1915
 Leucospis banksi Weld, 1922
 Leucospis bifasciata Klug, 1814
 Leucospis biguetina Jurine, 1807
 Leucospis bioculata Boucek, 1974
 Leucospis birkmani Brues, 1925
 Leucospis brasiliensis Boucek, 1974
 Leucospis brevicauda Fabricius, 1804
 Leucospis buchi Hedqvist, 1968
 Leucospis bulbiventris Cresson, 1872
 Leucospis calligastri (Ferrière, 1938)
 Leucospis carinifera Kriechbaumer, 1894
 Leucospis cayennensis Westwood, 1839
 Leucospis clavigaster Boucek, 1974
 Leucospis colombiana Boucek, 1974
 Leucospis conicus (Schrank, 1802)
 Leucospis coxalis Kirby, 1885
 Leucospis darjilingensis Mani, 1937
 Leucospis desantisi Boucek, 1974
 Leucospis dorsigera Fabricius, 1775
 Leucospis egaia Walker, 1862
 Leucospis elegans Klug, 1834
 Leucospis enderleini Ashmead, 1904
 Leucospis fallax Boucek, 1974
 Leucospis femoricincta Boucek, 1974
 Leucospis fuelleborniana Enderlein, 1903
 Leucospis funerea Schletterer, 1890
 Leucospis genalis Boucek, 1974
 Leucospis gigas Fabricius, 1793
 Leucospis giraulti Boucek, 1974
 Leucospis glaesaria Engel, 2002
 Leucospis globigera Boucek, 1974
 Leucospis guzeratensis Westwood, 1839
 Leucospis histrio Maindron, 1878
 Leucospis holubi Boucek, 1974
 Leucospis hopei Westwood, 1834
 Leucospis ignota Walker, 1862
 Leucospis imitans Boucek, 1974
 Leucospis incarnata Westwood, 1839
 Leucospis insularis Kirby, 1900
 Leucospis intermedia Illiger, 1807
 Leucospis japonica Walker, 1871
 Leucospis klugii Westwood, 1839
 Leucospis lankana Boucek & Narendran, 1981
 Leucospis latifrons Schletterer, 1890
 Leucospis leptomera Boucek, 1974
 Leucospis leucotelus Walker, 1852
 Leucospis mackerrasi Naumann, 1981
 Leucospis maculata Weld, 1922
 Leucospis malaica Schletterer, 1890
 Leucospis manaica Roman, 1920
 Leucospis metatibialis Boucek, 1974
 Leucospis mexicana Walker, 1862
 Leucospis micrura Schletterer, 1890
 Leucospis miniata Klug, 1834
 Leucospis moleyrei Maindron, 1878
 Leucospis morawitzi Schletterer, 1890
 Leucospis nambui Habu, 1977
 Leucospis namibica Boucek, 1974
 Leucospis nigerrima Kohl, 1908
 Leucospis nigripyga Boucek, 1974
 Leucospis niticoxa Boucek, 1974
 Leucospis obsoleta Klug, 1834
 Leucospis opalescens Weld, 1922
 Leucospis ornata Westwood, 1839
 Leucospis osmiae Boucek, 1974
 Leucospis parvula Boucek, 1974
 Leucospis pediculata Guérin-Méneville, 1844
 Leucospis petiolata Fabricius, 1787
 Leucospis pictipyga Boucek, 1974
 Leucospis pinna Grissell & Cameron, 2002
 Leucospis poeyi Guérin-Méneville, 1844
 Leucospis procera Schletterer, 1890
 Leucospis propinqua Schletterer, 1890
 Leucospis pubescens Boucek, 1974
 Leucospis pulchella Crawford, 1915
 Leucospis pulcherrima Nagase, 2007
 Leucospis pulchriceps Cameron, 1909
 Leucospis pyriformis (Weld, 1922)
 Leucospis regalis Westwood, 1874
 Leucospis reversa Boucek, 1974
 Leucospis rieki Boucek, 1974
 Leucospis rileyi Schletterer, 1890
 Leucospis robertsoni Crawford, 1909
 Leucospis robusta Weld, 1922
 Leucospis rostrata Boucek, 1974
 Leucospis santarema Walker, 1862
 Leucospis schlettereri Schulthess-Schindler, 1899
 Leucospis sedlaceki Boucek, 1974
 Leucospis signifera Boucek, 1974
 Leucospis sinensis Walker, 1862
 Leucospis slossonae Weld, 1922
 Leucospis speifera Walker, 1862
 Leucospis sumichrastii Cresson, 1872
 Leucospis texana Cresson, 1872
 Leucospis tricolor Kirby, 1883
 Leucospis vallicaucaensis Pujade-Villar & Caicedo, 2010
 Leucospis vanharteni Schmid-Egger, 2010
 Leucospis varicollis Cameron, 1909
 Leucospis ventricosa Boucek, 1974
 Leucospis versicolor Boucek, 1974
 Leucospis violaceipennis Strand, 1911
 Leucospis viridis Vago & Pauly, 2003
 Leucospis williamsi Boucek, 1974
 Leucospis xylocopae Burks, 1961
 Leucospis yasumatsui Habu, 1961

References

Further reading
Wasp Wednesday: Leucospis

Hymenoptera genera
Chalcidoidea